David Bednar may refer to:

David Bednar (general manager) (born 1952), former general manager of the Canadian National Exhibition Association
David A. Bednar (born 1952), LDS church leader, former BYU-Idaho president
David Bednar (baseball) (born 1994), MLB pitcher